The football tournament at the 2013 Central American Games is held in San José, Costa Rica from March 6 to March 16. Members who are affiliated to ORDECA are invite it to send their full women's national teams and men's U-21 teams to participate.

Participants

Venue

Schedule
The competition was spread out across eleven days, with the men and women competing on alternating dates.

Men's tournament

Squads

Groups

Group A

Group B

Semifinals

Third Place

Final

Medals

Women's tournament

Squads

Groups

Group A

Group B

Semifinals

Third Place

Final

Medals

References

Under
2013 Central American Games